Blekketjernshøgda is a mountain of the municipality of Nittedal in Akershus, Norway. It has a height of 613 meters above sea level.

References 

Nittedal
Mountains of Viken